Carl Bernardino Wirsching (September 10, 1886 – 1964) was an American engineer, veteran, and politician who was active in Los Angeles in the 1930s and 1940s. After serving in the United States Army as a part of the American Expeditionary Forces in France, he returned to Los Angeles to pursue political activities, running in the 1937 Los Angeles mayoral election and placing fourth in the primary.

Early life and career 
Wirsching was born on September 10, 1886, in Los Angeles, California to Robert E. Wirsching and Carlota E. Wirsching, with his family being descendants of Felipe de Neve through his mother. He had three siblings, Robert, Ernest, and Rose.

Wirsching graduated from a grammar school in 1902 and from Polytechnic High School in 1906. He received a Bachelor of Science from the University of Southern California in 1910 and a Bachelor of Engineering in 1919. He worked in the County Surveyor's office during his college years from 1910 to 1914 and afterwards with the County Road Department for the next three years.

Military career 
In 1917 Wirsching served with the American Expeditionary Forces in France as a Major of Engineers for the Second Division. In 1918, he was wounded in France after he was grazed by a shell splinter. He returned from France in 1919. He received a Croix de Guerre from France in 1919.

Political career 

In 1929, Wirsching was nominated by Mayor Frank L. Shaw to the Board of Public Works to succeed A. W. L. Dunn. In 1931, Wirsching was chosen president of the Board of Public Works by unanimous vote of its members, succeeding T. O. Johnson. In 1933, he was elected as the chair of the USC Alumni Association.

In 1937 Wirsching ran in that year's mayoral election, placing fourth in the primary behind Gordon L. McDonough, John Anson Ford, and incumbent Shaw. In May 1937, Wirsching endorsed Shaw for the mayoral race. In July 1938, Wirsching was recommended to the Board of Public Works by Mayor Shaw to succeed Hugh J. McGuire. In September 1938, he was named the "Official Greeter" for the American Legion. In 1934, he quit as a member of the Board of Public Works.

In 1941 mayor Fletcher Bowron renominated Wirsching to the Board of Public Works, but the Council failed to approve the nomination. In 1946, Wirsching was named the Long Beach City Manager, succeeding Samuel E. Vickers whom the Long Beach City Council had ousted with a 5–3 vote.

Personal life 
In 1913 he married Bess Aileen Cochran and had two children, Margaret Aileen and Patricia Ann. He died in 1964 in Los Angeles.

Military awards

References 
Links to the Los Angeles Times articles require the use of a library card.

1886 births
1964 deaths
United States Army personnel of World War I
Military personnel from California
Politicians from Los Angeles